The 2021 Asian Rowing Championships were the 20th Asian Rowing Championships and took place from 9 to 12 December 2021, in Royal Thai Navy Rowing Center, Ban Chang, Rayong Province, Thailand.

Medal summary

Men

Women

Medal table

References

 Results

External links
Asian Rowing Fedeation

Rowing Championships
Asian
Asian Rowing Championships
Asian